Gordon Lake or Lake Gordon may refer to:

Gordon Lake (Alberta), a lake in Alberta, Canada
Gordon Lake (Ontario), a list of lakes in the Canadian province of Ontario
Gordon Lake (Northwest Territories), a lake in Northwest Territories, Canada
Lake Gordon, a lake in Australia